Titi Adelagun Oyinsan (born 10 August 1985), popularly known as TitiTheDynamite is a Nigerian television host and former model.

Early life and education
Titi Oyinsan was born in Lagos, Nigeria to Nigerian parents. She moved to North London, England as an infant where she spent 10 years before moving back to Nigeria to attend Queen's College, Yaba, Lagos, where a flair for journalism was sparked then she went to the University of Lagos to study English Language.

Career

Modelling 
She began her career by being in the right place at the right time, at age 17 just a year after graduating high school. She accompanied a friend who had heard about a casting call in an advertising agency and got her first modelling job without even having a professional Head shot or photograph. Being continuously shortlisted over a month long casting, she was one of 5 others flown to South Africa to shoot a commercial. This job was for the very youthful Orange Soda Brand Fanta and was one of the first of its kind to fund such trip with Nigerian Based Models. She was Dubbed  "Titi Fanta" by many and still bears the Nick name in some places till date, After the fame of the Fanta campaign came to light She was on the top of the list for many different Advertising and Modelling agencies. She was in Campaigns for brands like "Coca-Cola, Amstel Malta. A chance meeting with Director / graphic artist Stanlee Ohikuare led to some shots being submitted to Zenith bank affiliates Visafone Network . She signed a 4 year contract  with Visafone to be on the sim-card package.

TV Presenter 
From modelling, she went into TV sort of by default because a lot of the producers that she worked with advised her to try out TV. So, she started off working for the NTA Network, from there she worked with Soundcity where she worked alongside Denrele Edun.

She is co-host of TV show Wake Up Nigeria on TVC News along with Abayomi Owope.

She is the host of the English language quiz show for secondary schools in Nigeria called WORD SMITH and is a spinoff of the CowbellPedia Math Competition.

Philanthropy 
She launched a fundraising education campaign for the girl child tagged “#IAmDynamite project”. The campaign has received support from several Nigerian celebrities who have signed on to the project. The likes of Alibaba, Omawumi, Dr SID, Fela Durotoye, DJ Sose, Gbenga Adeyinka, Sammy Okposo, Bikki Laoye, Kaffy, Uche Nnaji, Mochedda, Reekado Banks, Skales, Denrele, Omotola Ekeinde, Bryan, Do2dtun, Sulai Aledeh and many more. #iAmDynamite is an Online and In-Person Campaign created for Titi Oyinsan on the celebration of her 30th birthday. The birthday celebration was set to host major celebrities who endorsed the project. The Central goal is to raise funds to send 30 young girls between the ages of 5 and 12 to school; this campaign is in partnership with the StayInSchool Nigeria Initiative founded by Tricia Ikponmwonba.

References

1985 births
Living people
Queen's College, Lagos alumni
University of Lagos alumni
Nigerian media personalities
Nigerian philanthropists
Television personalities from Lagos
Yoruba women television personalities
Models from Lagos
Nigerian female models
Yoruba female models